Silviu Izvoranu (born 3 December 1982) is a Romanian former footballer who played mainly as a defensive midfielder.

Izvoranu started his career at Dunărea Galaţi before moving to Oțelul, where he played for three years. He then moved to Politehnica Timişoara in the winter of 2006. His previous clubs include Dinamo București, Astra Ploieşti, Internaţional, Universitatea Cluj and FC Volyn Lutsk.

Izvoranu is a former Romanian U21 international.

References

External links

1982 births
Living people
Sportspeople from Galați
Romanian footballers
Liga II players
FCM Dunărea Galați players
Liga I players
ASC Oțelul Galați players
FC Politehnica Timișoara players
FC Dinamo București players
FC Astra Giurgiu players
FC Internațional Curtea de Argeș players
CS Universitatea Craiova players
Ukrainian Premier League players
FC Volyn Lutsk players
Romanian expatriate footballers
Expatriate footballers in Ukraine
Romanian expatriate sportspeople in Ukraine
Association football defenders
FC Universitatea Cluj players